Rachel Elnaugh (born 12 December 1964) is a British entrepreneur who founded the UK gift company Red Letter Days. She was one of the investors participating in the first two series of BBC Two's TV show Dragons' Den.

Early life
When she was younger she lived above her father's electrical shop, 'Elnaugh and Son' in Chelmsford. Rachel attended Chelmsford County High School for Girls, a Grammar School in Essex. She originally wanted to take art history, but she was rejected by five universities, and she climbed the corporate ladder from being an office junior in a local firm of accountants to become a qualified tax consultant with Arthur Andersen.

Career

Red Letter Days

In 1989, Elnaugh founded Red Letter Days, one of the first UK companies to sell experiential gifts, such as motor racing days, hot air ballooning and health spa days. The idea to set up Red Letter Days came from purchasing tickets to a cricket match for her father as a gift. 
 
The company grew to an £18 million annual turnover and led to Elnaugh being a 2001/2 finalist in the Veuve Clicquot Businesswoman of the Year and Ernst & Young Entrepreneur of the Year.

After an attempt to expand the business into the retail sector, Red Letter Days went into administration on 1 August 2005. Elnaugh, who had become a dragon on the TV series Dragons' Den, sold the remaining assets and goods of Red Letter Days to fellow dragons Peter Jones and Theo Paphitis.

ITV1's Tonight programme criticized the business model of Red Letter Days, which included unpaid suppliers and disappointed purchasers. The programme suggested that the company failed to escrow or earmark supplier payment equity, instead of using it for working capital. However, Elnaugh blamed Red Letter Days' bankers.

Dragons' Den
In the mid 2000s, Elnaugh joined the BBC's television series Dragons' Den. She was one of the five investors ("Dragons") in the first two series of the show, making five agreed investment offers – in Grails, Le Beanock, Snowbone, Elizabeth Galton and Bedlam Puzzles.

After Dragon's Den and Red Letter Days
Her book Business Nightmares about the fine line between business success and failure was published by Crimson in May 2008. After this, Elnaugh was a business mentor for other entrepreneurs and founded the digital publishing and marketing platform Source TV in 2013. Her book PROSPERITY was published on 23 April 2016.

Publications
 Business Nightmares: When Entrepreneurs Hit Crisis Point... 8 May  2008, Crimson, 
 "PROSPERITY" 23 April 2016, Source Publishing

References

External links
 Rachel Elnaugh's website
 

1964 births
Living people
English businesspeople
People from Chelmsford
British women company founders
People educated at Chelmsford County High School for Girls